Raymond Daniel Doucett (May 6, 1907 – March 29, 1970) was a wholesale grocer and political figure in New Brunswick, Canada. He represented Restigouche County in the Legislative Assembly of New Brunswick from 1963 to 1970 as a Liberal member.

He was born in Charlo, New Brunswick, the son of Peter Doucett and Annabell Henderson. In 1926, he married Catherine Ila Lutes. Doucett served as chairman of the school board, also served on the council for Restigouche County and was a justice of the peace. Doucett served as Minister of Public Works in the province's Executive Council from 1967 to 1970.

His son Rayburn also served in the provincial assembly.

References 

 Canadian Parliamentary Guide, 1968, PG Normandin

1907 births
1970 deaths
New Brunswick Liberal Association MLAs
Canadian justices of the peace